Buckhorn is an unincorporated community in Brown County, Illinois, United States.

References

Unincorporated communities in Brown County, Illinois
Unincorporated communities in Illinois